The MFF Football Centre is a stadium in the independent municipality of Ulaanbaatar within Mongolia.

Overview
It is currently used for football matches and boasts an artificial playing surface. 

The newly-expanded 5,000 seat stadium at the football centre opened in October 2013.

It hosted Mongolia's qualification campaigns for the AFC Challenge Cup and the 2014 FIFA World Cup.

In September 2022, the 110m x 73m field was resurfaced using a foam, sand, and cork mixture instead of rubber, a process that was newly-approved by FIFA. The stadium became the first in the country to feature the fully recyclable surface.

References

Football venues in Mongolia
Buildings and structures in Ulaanbaatar
National football academies